Mary C. Noble (born 1949 in Jackson, Kentucky) is the former Secretary of the Kentucky Justice and Public Safety Cabinet and a former Deputy Chief Justice of the Kentucky Supreme Court. Noble was elected to the court in November 2006 where she represented the 5th Supreme Court District. She defeated appointed Justice John C. Roach. Prior to that election, she served as a circuit judge in Fayette County. Chief Justice John D. Minton, Jr. named Noble Deputy Chief Justice on September 1, 2010. Prior to her election to the Supreme Court, Noble was elected to the Fayette Fifth Circuit Court in 1991, and she was 
re-elected in 2000. Noble retired from the bench in 2017.

In December 2019, Governor Andy Beshear appointed Noble to the position of Secretary of the Kentucky Justice and Public Safety Cabinet. In this capacity as secretary, she oversees more than 7,000 employees and five major departments, including Corrections, Criminal Justice Training, Public Advocacy, Juvenile Justice, and the Kentucky State Police. The office also oversees the State Medical Examiner and the Office of Drug Control Policy.

Noble received a B.S. in English and sociology from Austin Peay State University in 1971, an M.A. in psychology from Austin Peay State University in 1975 and a J.D. from the University of Kentucky in 1981.

References

1949 births
Living people
American women judges
Austin Peay State University alumni
Kentucky state court judges
Justices of the Kentucky Supreme Court
State cabinet secretaries of Kentucky
People from Jackson, Kentucky
Politicians from Lexington, Kentucky
University of Kentucky College of Law alumni
Women in Kentucky politics
21st-century American women judges
21st-century American judges